Syeda Sakina Islam (7 October 1928 – 21 August 2008) served as a Member of Parliament for two times. She was elected as a member of parliament from Bangladesh Nationalist Party in 1979 and on 1986 from Jatiya Party. She was the founding editor of Barisal Ladies Club, and a volunteer member of Azad Hind.

Early life and education
Islam was born on 7 October 1928 in Kolkata. She belonged to a Bengali Muslim family of Syeds originally from the village of Talibpur in Murshidabad. Her father, Syed Badrudduja, was a former mayor of Kolkata and a member of the Bengal Legislative Assembly and India's Lok Sabha, and her mother was Zaynab Begum. Through her paternal grandfather Syed Abdul Ghafur, her ancestors descended from Ali, the fourth Caliph of Islam. She had 10 siblings, including politician Syeda Razia Faiz. Islam is a graduate of Lady Brabourne College.

Work
Islam served as a member of parliament twice. In 1979, she was elected from Barisal and Bhola District. In 1986, she was elected from Barishal, Jhalkathi District and Pirojpur District. Islam served as vice chairman of Jatiya Party's central ladies group and Chairperson of Bangladesh Jatiyo Mohila Songstha (Bairsal District). Islam was the first female member of the speaker panel of Bangladesh Parliament, Jatiya Sangsad.

In 1977, as a commissioner of Barisal Pourosova, she attended the Asian Women Conference. She also attended World Women Development Conference in 1978. She accompanied President Ziaur Rahman at the Commonwealth Heads of Government Meeting 1979 held in Lusaka, Zambia.

Personal life
Islam was married to the journalist and playwright Fakhrul Islam Khan. The couple has one son, Amirul Islam Khan Bulbul, and two daughters, Shabnam Wadud Kaya and Saguafa Khanam Joardar.

References 

1928 births
2008 deaths
Bengali Muslims
20th-century Bengalis
People from Kolkata
People from Murshidabad district
Lady Brabourne College alumni
Bangladesh Nationalist Party politicians
2nd Jatiya Sangsad members
3rd Jatiya Sangsad members
Women members of the Jatiya Sangsad
20th-century Bangladeshi women politicians
Bangladeshi people of Indian descent
Bangladeshi people of Arab descent
West Bengal politicians